John Le Mesurier may refer to:

John Le Mesurier (Alderney) (1781–1843), last hereditary governor of Alderney
John Lemesurier (1826–1891), Canadian politician who served as mayor of Quebec City
John Le Mesurier (British Army officer), (1834-1903)
John Le Mesurier (1912–1983), English actor
John Le Mesurier (b. 1933/34), English carpet salesman and alleged conspirator in the Thorpe affair

See also
John Le Masurier, British athletics coach